Fury is the codename shared by three DC Comics superheroes, two of whom are mother and daughter, both of whom are directly connected with the Furies of mythology, and the third who is an altogether different character.

Lyta Hall appears in the Netflix drama series The Sandman (2022), portrayed by Razane Jammal.

Fictional character biography

Pre-Crisis
Originally Fury was Hippolyta "Lyta" Trevor, the daughter of the Golden Age Wonder Woman and Steve Trevor; Lyta inherited all her mother's powers. She was introduced in Wonder Woman (vol. 1) #300. Like most Golden Age-related characters at the time, Lyta lived on the parallel world of "Earth-Two".

Lyta later adopted the identity of "The Fury", named after the Furies of mythology, and was one of the founding members of Infinity Inc., in the book of the same name written by Roy Thomas. She began a relationship with her teammate Hector Hall, the Silver Scarab, whom she had met as a child; they reunited as classmates at UCLA. Shortly after their decision to marry, Hector was possessed by an enemy of his father, Hawkman, and killed. Fury was pregnant with Hector's child, and it was instrumental in the Silver Scarab's defeat. In 52, a new Earth-2 with a similar history is created, and Lyta Trevor serves as a member of the Justice Society Infinity.

Lyta, like all her Infinity Inc. counterparts, briefly made an appearance during the DC Convergence crossover. Powerless and trapped on Telos, Lyta Trevor became a police officer before regaining her powers and taking on a Post-Crisis version of Jonah Hex. Eventually, Lyta and all of Infinity Inc. take over for the Justice Society on a returned Earth-2.

Post-Crisis

Hippolyta "Lyta" Trevor-Hall
Following the 1985 miniseries Crisis on Infinite Earths, the Golden Age Wonder Woman retroactively no longer existed, and Lyta was now the daughter of the newly created character Helena Kosmatos, the Golden Age Fury (a Greek superheroine and a member of the All-Star Squadron, and an avatar of the Fury Tisiphone) and had been raised by Joan Trevor (née Dale), the Quality Comics superheroine Miss America, and her husband, Derek. Lyta was told of her mother's history by Alecto, and visited yearly by the time-travelling Hippolyta, who trained Lyta as a heroine.

For a while, Lyta served with Infinity, Inc., but eventually left the team to bear a child. At home, Lyta was visited by a resurrected Hector Hall. After his death, Hall mistakenly believed he had been chosen as the Guardian of Dreams, the Sandman, and joined the real Sandman in the Dream Dimension, where they had adventures masterminded by the two schemers Brute and Glob.

In Neil Gaiman's The Sandman, it was revealed that the Dream Dimension was a portion of the Dreaming enclosed by Brute and Glob during Morpheus' imprisonment, as a domain of their own. Upon Morpheus' return, Hector's soul was released and Lyta was sent back to Earth, where she gave birth to their son. Afterwards, Lyta blamed Morpheus for Hector's death; but Morpheus visited the child, named him Daniel, and claimed him as an heir. When Daniel was later captured by Loki and Robin Goodfellow, Lyta invoked the Furies to destroy Morpheus, whereupon Daniel became the new Lord of the Dreaming.

At the wake held for Morpheus, Lyta met her son in his new role. He gave her his protection from the immortals offended by her, and returned her to the waking world.

Lyta's story continued in the graphic novel Sandman Presents: The Furies. She appeared in JSA where she was reunited with Hector, now reincarnated as Doctor Fate. At some point between the graphic novel and her return in JSA, the evil wizard Mordru had captured Lyta and imprisoned her in Dr. Fate's amulet. Once freed, she rejoined her husband and later regained her true memories of Daniel.

During the Spectre's quest to destroy magic throughout the DC Universe, he banished Doctor Fate and Lyta to a freezing mountain, later identified as part of Hell. In JSA #80, Lyta recalls being visited by Daniel in a dream, where he offers to bring Lyta and Hector to the Dreaming for all eternity; because Hector is dying, Lyta accepts the offer.

Helena Kosmatos

Helena Kosmatos was a new character named "Fury", created to replace the Golden Age Wonder Woman as Lyta Trevor's biological mother. She began appearing in Thomas' Young All-Stars, a book set in World War II, and her backstory was revealed in Secret Origins #12. She was a Greek national who had learned her brother was co-operating with Italian Fascists who previously killed her father. When she confronted her brother with this revelation in front of their mother, it was too much for the widow to take and she died of an instant heart attack. Wishing revenge upon her brother, she was approached by Tisiphone, one of the Eumenides or Furies, who gave her a suit of magic armor, which increased her strength, speed and stamina. When angered, she became an avatar of Tisiphone, and it was in this state that she killed her brother.

She was later briefly released from this possession, and retained the other powers, but is once again acting as Tisiphone's avatar.

At one point, the Amazon Queen Hippolyta took over the role of Wonder Woman and traveled back in time to aid the JSA against the Nazis. During this time, Helena began to look to Hippolyta as a mother figure and believed that she was indeed the daughter of the Amazon queen, despite the knowledge that her true parents were killed during the war. When Queen Hippolyta returned to her own time, Helena sought a magical means to gain eternal youth; this was accomplished via a magical document that, if destroyed, would revert Helena to her true age and possible death. After this was done, Helena met Hippolyta's true daughter Diana and took an immediate dislike to her. By this point, Helena's mental state was near collapse, as she began to behave irrationally. Diana took her to Themyscira, where Hippolyta addressed Helena as a daughter to support her fragile psyche. After Hippolyta's death during the Our Worlds At War saga, Helena went into mourning and much of her mental imbalance was resolved. Thereafter she served Artemis and Philippus as a trusted aide. Her powers were briefly stolen from her by Barbara Ann Minerva whose role as the Cheetah had been usurped by Sebastian Ballestros. Minerva used the power of Tisiphone to kill Ballestros, regaining her Cheetah form, and restored Helena's powers.

During the events of Infinite Crisis, OMACs engaged the Amazons of Themyscira in battle, and the Amazons relocated their island home to another plane of existence. Helena Kosmatos is shown leaving with the other Amazons. A year after their departure, the Amazons return to wage war on the U.S., which takes place in the Amazons Attack storyline. Helena is never shown as part of this return.

Erik Storn
In 52 Week 21, a new Infinity Inc. created by Lex Luthor was introduced, with a male hero going by the name of Fury. The newest Fury had been given blackened skin and razor-sharp claws from submitting to Luthor's Everyman Project. Infinity Inc. #1 (Sept. 2007) reveals that, after Luthor's arrest and after the project was shut down, Erik has become depressed when his powers were shut down and has developed a stuttering problem. He is also suffering from hot flashes and mistakenly took his mother's clothes from the laundry one day. In Infinity Inc. #3, Erik reveals that the stutter is a defense mechanism to hide his desire for self-castration. He also transforms into a fighting woman named "Erika". In #8, Erik/Erika is given a costume and the superhero name "Amazing Woman".

Erik is later found and tortured by Codename: Assassin, having discovered, and shared with Jimmy Olsen, precious information about Project 7734, the secret agenda of General Sam Lane for Kryptonians. Shifting one last time to the all-powerful Erika body, Erik is able to put Jimmy in contact with Natasha Irons before dying.

Powers and abilities
Fury has superhuman strength, speed and endurance, enhanced senses and durability, animal empathy, and regenerative healing factor. She is also invulnerable to magic.

Other versions

Earth 2
In September 2011, The New 52 rebooted DC's continuity. In this new timeline, Fury made her debut in Earth 2 #8 (2013). She is the daughter of the late Wonder Woman of Earth 2 and Steppenwolf of Apokolips. In issue #14 of Earth 2: Society (Sept 2016), she reveals Fury is her war name, while Donna is her true name, thus making this Fury a doppelganger of Donna Troy. The first Fury, Lyta Trevor, was more of an analogue to Donna Troy.

This version of Fury is the last Amazon, as the other Amazons had perished five years earlier during the Apokoliptian invasion of Earth 2. She is shown to be working with Steppenwolf. This Fury wears a red and silver costume resembling that of Orion. This new version of the character appears to be more powerful than the previous versions. As mentioned in the New 52 Earth 2 comic book, Fury and Big Barda are evenly matched in strength, as well as skill. In World's Finest Huntress/Power Girl Annual #1, a 'First Contact Prelude' issue, Donna is seen trading blows and going toe to toe with Power Girl, who at the time was still calling herself "Supergirl", displaying further proof of how strong and powerful she truly is. It is also mentioned that she has received training from Big Barda, as well as her father Steppenwolf.

As Darkseid's forces converge closer to Earth 2 and assimilate the planet as fuel for Apokolips, Mister Miracle manages to change Fury's mind and she joins the opposition against Darkseid. Following the destruction of Earth 2 and the events of Convergence, Fury takes on the role of Wonder Woman of Earth Two. She is more warlike than her mother, and willing to use deadly force if necessary. At the end of the series Earth 2: Society, Fury uses Pandora's Box from the Ultra-Humanite to reshape Earth 2 into like the classic Golden Age era and World War II setting, but mixed with contemporary technology and absence of any international crisis, super-villains or the Wonders.

In other media

 A character inspired by the Lyta Trevor and Helena Kosmatos incarnations of Fury called Aresia appears in the Justice League episode "Fury", voiced by Julie Bowen. As a child, she and her mother were forced to flee their unspecified homeland on a refugee ship, but it was attacked and sunk by pirates. After being separated from her mother and left aimlessly drifting for days, Aresia eventually washed ashore on Themyscira, where she was taken in by Queen Hippolyta and raised as an Amazon. During the last stage of her Amazon rebirth, Aresia secretly left the island to exact revenge on the world's men, believing this will make her a hero in the other Amazons' eyes. With help from Lex Luthor's Injustice Gang, she makes a special magic-based virus that will only affect men and tests it on Gotham City, plunging it into chaos. The Justice League intervene, but the male members succumb to the virus, leaving Wonder Woman and Hawkgirl. Aresia joins forces with Star Sapphire and Tsukuri to spread her virus globally via a hijacked stealth bomber and modified missiles before telling Hippolyta of what she has done. Disgusted that Aresia broke Amazon law, Hippolyta reveals the ship's male captain rescued Aresia and accompanied her to Themyscira before dying of heart failure. Despite this, Aresia intends to continue her plot until Wonder Woman and Hawkgirl drive off her allies and jam the bomber's missile bay doors. The Leaguers and Hippolyta escape, but Aresia dies in the subsequent plane crash. The heroines later discover Aresia's notes and use them to create an antidote for her virus.
 An African-American version of Fury inspired by the Erik Storn incarnation named Rosa appears in Young Justice, voiced by Quei Tann. Similarly to Storn, Rosa is a member of Lex Luthor's Infinity Inc., which is later reworked into the Infinitors. While not stated in the series, series developer Greg Weisman confirmed Rosa to be a transgender woman when he retweeted a question from a Twitter user. 
 Lyta Hall appears in the TV adaptation of The Sandman, portrayed by Razane Jammal.

References

External links
The Furies (article by Bob Rozakis)
Bio on dcdatabaseproject

Articles about multiple fictional characters
Characters created by Ross Andru
Characters created by Roy Thomas
Comics characters introduced in 1983
Comics characters introduced in 1987
DC Comics Amazons
DC Comics characters who can move at superhuman speeds
DC Comics characters with accelerated healing
DC Comics characters with superhuman senses
DC Comics characters with superhuman strength
DC Comics fantasy characters
DC Comics female superheroes
DC Comics female supervillains
Earth-Two
Fictional avatars
Fictional characters from parallel universes
Classical mythology in DC Comics
Superheroes who are adopted
The Sandman (comic book)
Wonder Woman characters